Zaafrane is a small desert oasis village in central Tunisia. It is the centre for the traditionally nomadic Adhara people.

External links 
 Lexicorient

Populated places in Tunisia